This is a list of games for the Commodore PET personal computer system, sorted alphabetically. See Lists of video games for other platforms.

<div style="max-width:115em; -width:100%">

References

Commodore PET
Commodore PET games